San Luis Obispo is a city in California named after St. Louis, the Bishop of Toulouse.  It may also refer to:

San Luis Obispo County, California
Cal Poly San Luis Obispo
Cerro San Luis Obispo
Mission San Luis Obispo de Tolosa
San Luis Obispo Creek
San Luis Obispo National Forest